Bruce Gilden (born 1946) is an American street photographer. He is best known for his candid close-up photographs of people on the streets of New York City, using a flashgun. He has had various books of his work published, has received the European Publishers Award for Photography and is a Guggenheim Fellow. Gilden has been a member of Magnum Photos since 1998. He was born in Brooklyn, New York.

Life and work
Gilden was born in Brooklyn, New York. While studying sociology at Penn State, he saw Michelangelo Antonioni's film Blowup in 1968. Influenced by the film, he purchased his first camera and began taking night classes in photography at the School of Visual Arts of New York. Fascinated with people on the street and the idea of visual spontaneity, Gilden turned to a career in photography. His work is characterized by his use of flash photography. He has worked in black and white most of his life, but he began shooting in color and digital when he was introduced to the Leica S camera as part of Magnum's Postcards From America project. Gilden has been a member of Magnum Photos since 1998.

His first major project was of people at Coney Island. He has photographed people on the streets of New York, Japan's yakuza mobsters, homeless people, prostitutes, and members of bike gangs between 1995 and 2000. According to Gilden, he was fascinated by the duality and double lives of the individuals he photographed. He has also photographed rural Ireland and horseracing there, as well as voodoo rituals in Haiti.

Gilden is the subject of the documentary film Misery Loves Company: The Life and Death of Bruce Gilden (2007).

Reception
Gilden has described the way he photographs as “flash in one hand and jumping at people”. Sean O'Hagan, reviewing Gilden's Face (2015) in The Guardian wrote that "his style seems to work against any intention to humanise his subjects." Contemporary American photographer Joel Meyerowitz has this to say about Gilden: “He’s a fucking bully. I despise the work, I despise the attitude, he’s an aggressive bully and all the pictures look alike because he only has one idea—‘I’m gonna embarrass you, I’m going to humiliate you.’ I’m sorry, but no.”

Publications

Publications by Gilden
The Small Haiti Portfolio (Limited Edition), Helsinki, Finland, 1990.
Facing New York, Manchester, UK: Cornerhouse Publications, 1992. . Published in conjunction with an exhibition at the Chrysler Museum of Art, Norfolk, VA.
Bleus, Mission Photographique Transmanche (Cross Channel Photographic Mission) no. 13. Douchy-les-Mines, France: Centre Régional de la Photographie (CRP) (Regional Centre for Photography), Nord Pas-de-Calais, 1994.
Haïti, Dreams and Nightmares. Stockport, UK: Dewi Lewis and Paris: Marval, 1997.
After the Off. Stockport, UK: Dewi Lewis, 1999. . Photographs by Gilden, short story by Dermot Healy.
Ciganos. Lisbon, Portugal: Centro Portuguès de Fotografia, 1999.
Haiti. Stockport, UK: Dewi Lewis and Paris: Marval, 1999. .
Go. London: Trebruk and New York: Magnum Photos, 2000. .
Coney Island. London: Trebruk, 2002. .
A Beautiful Catastrophe. Brooklyn, NY: Powerhouse, 2005. .
Fashion Magazine. Paris: Magnum Photos, 2006. . With text contributions by Hedi Slimane, Viktor & Rolf, Azzedine Alaïa, Ingrid Sischy, Bob Colacello and Francesco Vezzoli. In English and French.
Bruce Gilden. Stern Portfolio No.64. Krefeld, Germany: teNeues, 2011. .
Foreclosures. London: Browns, 2013. . Available in standard edition (edition of 400) and slipcase edition (edition of 100).
A Complete Examination of Middlesex. 2013. London: Archive of Modern Conflict. .
Bruce Gilden. Photofile series. London: Thames & Hudson, 2014. .
Bruce Gilden. Photo Poche series. Arles, France: Actes Sud, 2014. . Preface by Hans-Michael Koetzle. French-language version.
Moscow Terminus. New York: Dashwood Books, 2014. Edition of 1000 copies.
Face. Stockport, UK: Dewi Lewis, 2015. . With a text by Chris Klatell.
Hey Mister, Throw me Some Beads!. Heidelberg, Germany: Kehrer, 2015. .
Un Nouveau Regard Sur La Mobilité Urbaine. Paris: La Martinière and RATP, 2015. .
Syracuse, 1981. Tokyo: Super Labo, 2018. Edition of 1000 copies.
Only God Can Judge Me. London: Browns, 2018. . Edition of 700 copies.
Palermo Gilden. Palermo, Sicily: 89books, 2020. Edition of 89 copies. .
Black Country. Setanta, 2022.

Publications with contributions by Gilden
Magnum Stories. London: Phaidon, 2004. . Edited by Chris Boot.
Mirror Mirror: Portugal as seen by Magnum Photographers. Göttingen: Steidl, 2005. . Photographs by Bruno Barbey, Henri Cartier-Bresson, Thomas Hoepker, Jean Gaumy, Gilden, Josef Koudelka, Guy Le Querrec, Susan Meiselas, Inge Morath, Martin Parr, Gilles Peress, Gueorgui Pinkhassov and Miguel Rio Branco.
Coney Island. Paris: Trans Photographic, 2009. . Photographs by Johnny Miller and Baptiste Lignel. Text by Sophie Gilden and Bruce Gilden.
Street Photography Now. London: Thames & Hudson, 2010. . Edited by Sophie Howarth and Stephen McLaren.
Magnum Contact Sheets. London: Thames & Hudson, 2011. .
Magnum Contact Sheets. Edited by Kristen Lubben.
Magnum Contact Sheets. London: Thames & Hudson, 2011. .
Magnum Contact Sheets. London: Thames & Hudson, 2014. . Compact edition.
Magnum Contact Sheets: The Collector's Edition: Bruce Gilden, Yakuza, 1998. London: Thames & Hudson, 2011. .

Awards

 1979: Artist's Fellowship, New York Foundation for the Arts, New York.
 1980: Photographer's Fellowship, National Endowment for the Arts.
 1984: Photographer's Fellowship, National Endowment for the Arts.
 1984: Artist's Fellowship, New York Foundation for the Arts, New York.
 1992: Photographer's Fellowship, National Endowment for the Arts.
 1992: Artist's Fellowship, New York Foundation for the Arts, New York.
1995: Villa Medicis Hors les Murs (an artist's fellowship), from Institut Français.
 1996: European Publishers Award for Photography for Haiti.
 1999: Artist's Fellowship, from the Japan Foundation, for Tokyo Extremes.
 2000: Artist's Fellowship, New York Foundation for the Arts, New York.
 2013: Guggenheim Fellowship from the John Simon Guggenheim Memorial Foundation.

Collections
Gilden's work is held in the following collections:
Tokyo Metropolitan Museum of Photography, Tokyo, Japan.
Victoria and Albert Museum, London.

References

External links

 Gilden profile at Magnum Photos
  (video)
  (video)
 National Public Radio interview with Gilden (audio)

"In Your Face: An Interview with Bruce Gilden" , GUP Magazine, 2015

1946 births
Living people
American photographers
Magnum photographers
Photography in Ireland
Photography in Japan
Street photographers